Jeffrey Squire (born 23 September 1951) in Newport, Monmouthshire, is a former Welsh international rugby union player and British Lion.

Club career
He started his playing career at St Lukes where he was captain, then Cross Keys RFC, Newbridge RFC, Newport RFC and joined  Pontypool RFC in September 1978.
Jeff Squire made his debut for Pontypool on 9th September 1978 in a 56 - 3 win against Pontypool Junior Union.  He was club captain for Pontypool from 1979 until 1982 and Player of the Year for the 1981/82 season.  In total for Pontypool he made 177 appearances and scored 62 tries.

International & British Lion
He was called to the  side in 1977, playing against Ireland and France. He was also selected for the 1977 British Lions tour to New Zealand and played in Newport's Welsh Cup winning side. The next international season was to be one of the most memorable in Wales with the Grand Slam won and he played against England, Scotland, Ireland and France. He also played against Australia and the All Blacks again.

Jeff Squire gained 29 caps in total for Wales, scoring three tries, the first against England at Twickenham in 1980, the second against England at Cardiff in 1983 and his third against France in Paris in 1983.  He also played in the non-cap games for Wales against Argentina in 1976, Romania in 1979 and the New Zealand Maoris in 1982.

He was selected again for the British Lions for their tour of South Africa in 1980, playing in all four tests.  He toured for a third time with the Lions in 1983 to New Zealand.  In total, he made 32 appearances for the Lions, including 6 tests and scored 6 tries.

Notes

1951 births
Living people
Alumni of the University of Exeter
Barbarian F.C. players
British & Irish Lions rugby union players from Wales
Cross Keys RFC players
Newbridge RFC players
Newport RFC players
Pontypool RFC players
Rugby union flankers
Rugby union players from Caerphilly County Borough
Wales international rugby union players
Wales rugby union captains
Welsh rugby union players